Malometasternum is a genus of hoverflies from the family Syrphidae, in the order Diptera.

Species
Malometasternum rufocaudata (Ferguson, 1926)

References

Diptera of Australasia
Hoverfly genera
Taxa named by Raymond Corbett Shannon
Eristalinae